Khurrianwala , is a town near Faisalabad, tehsil Jaranwala Punjab, Pakistan. It is located on Faisalabad to Lahore GT Road. Its postal code is 37630.

Economy 
A large number of textile mills are located on Faisalabad to Lahore Road which play important role in Economy of Pakistan and are the source of income for people. Agriculture is also a profession of rural people of villages near Khurrianwala.

References

Cities and towns in Faisalabad District